Athletics at the 1980 Summer Paralympics consisted of 275 events. The Games saw 1,973 Para athletes from 43 countries compete in 13 sports.

The full list of sports was; archery, Para athletics, dartchery, lawn bowls, goalball, shooting Para sport, Para swimming, table tennis, sitting volleyball, weightlifting, wheelchair basketball, wheelchair fencing and wrestling.

The USA and Poland tied for the most gold medals in Arnhem, with USA taking 195 overall medals and Poland finishing with 177. Germany, Canada and Great Britain rounded out the top 5 on the medals chart. Bahamas, Jamaica, Kenya, Kuwait, Luxembourg, Sudan and Zimbabwe won their first ever medals in this competition.

Participating nations

Medal summary

Men's events

Women's events

References 

 

 
1980 Summer Paralympics events
1980
Paralympics